Benasing Macarambon Jr. is a former Congressman of the Second District of Lanao del Sur, Philippines.  In 2018 he was appointed by President Rodrigo Duterte a Subic Bay Metropolitan Authority board member and director till September 22, 2022.

References

Living people
Filipino Muslims
Year of birth missing (living people)